Marchtrenk is a municipality with about 12.500 inhabitants in the district Wels-Land in the province Upper Austria of the  Republic of Austria. It is situated on the river Traun.

Population

Mayors

 1969–1990 Ferdinand Reisinger (SPÖ)
 bis 2013 Fritz Kaspar (SPÖ)
 since 2013 Paul Mahr (SPÖ)

References

Cities and towns in Wels-Land District